Projekt Revolution was a music festival hosted by Linkin Park, bringing artists of various genres of music together. Linkin Park started Projekt Revolution in the year 2002 with just one stage. Then, in 2004, they announced the Revolution Stage (Second Stage) where the smaller bands/artists would perform.

2002 

2002 brought Linkin Park the idea to plan the Projekt Revolution Tour series, and the series began in that year. They thought it was part festival tour, part concert tour, part national tour. It is the first of the Projekt Revolution Tour Series. For this edition, Linkin Park was supporting their debut album, Hybrid Theory. It was also one of the shortest of the PR Series.
 Main Stage
 Linkin Park
 Cypress Hill
 Adema
 DJ Z-Trip

Setlist

2003 

The 2003 Projekt Revolution Tour, was the shortest of the PR tour series until the 2011 edition. This marked the first of two Projekt Revolutions in support of Linkin Park's second album, Meteora.
 Main Stage
 Linkin Park
 Mudvayne
 Xzibit
 Blindside
 Cold (July dates only)
 Revis (last two dates only)

Setlist

2004 

The Projekt Revolution 2004 Tour's Stage has a big bit change. It was divided into the Main Stage and Revolution stages, while its set stays connected. The 2004 PR Tour was the longest of the Projekt Revolution Tour series. This was also Korn's last tour to feature their full original lineup with original guitarist Brian Welch, who leaves the band in February the following year until his return in 2013. Jonathan Davis of Korn would come out on "One Step Closer" to sing the reanimated part of the song.
 Main Stage
 Linkin Park
 Korn
 Snoop Dogg
 The Used
 Less Than Jake (except the Dallas show due to one of the band members being sick. Ghostface Killah replaced them on the main stage)
 Revolution Stage
 Ghostface Killah with P.A.W.N. LASERS / Louis Capet XXVI
 Funeral for a Friend (except shows from 27th to 30th August due to Reading and Leeds Festivals)
 downset.
 M.O.P. (except the first show due to travel plans)
 Mike V. and The Rats (select shows)
 No Warning (from 24th July to 13th August)
 Instruction (from 14th to 28th August)
 Autopilot Off (from 30th August to 5th September)

Setlist

2007 

For 2007, Linkin Park decided to make the tour ostensibly "green" by donating $1 of every ticket to American Forests through their charity Music for Relief and using biodiesel on a majority of their buses, eliminating an estimated 350 tons of carbon emissions. There were also informative booths that showed concert goers how to lower their greenhouse gas emissions.

It was revealed in Revolver magazine that Muse was in the list of bands Linkin Park had picked but couldn't join Projekt Revolution as they had other commitments to deal with.

On August 22, 2007, MySpace.com streamed the concert live, allowing MySpace users to watch the concert for free from their performance at DTE Energy Music Theatre in Clarkston, Michigan. The event was hosted by Matt Pinfield.

Linkin Park sold their performance from the 2007 PR tour at the merchandise booth. Each CD came with a blank disc and a special code that allowed fans to download and burn that specific Linkin Park performance from the venue it was purchased at. The price of purchase for the CD was $11.00. It was sold at every venue except for Jones Beach in Wantagh, NY due to disagreements with the venue wanting a portion of the CD sales. In October 2013, Linkin Park revealed that they will relaunch Projekt Revolution in 2014; it is on the list for To-Come.

 Main Stage
 Linkin Park
 My Chemical Romance
 Taking Back Sunday
 HIM
 Placebo
 Julien-K
 Revolution Stage
 Mindless Self Indulgence
 Saosin
 The Bled
 Styles of Beyond
 Madina Lake (missed shows from 10th to 13th August due to Summer Sonic 2007)
Art of Chaos (Winner of the Battle of the Bands selected to 7 dates on the tour from 28th July to 5th August)
Setlist

2008 

This was the first time the tour was also outside of North America. Their performance in Milton Keynes was announced months beforehand, which made it highly anticipated amongst fans waiting to attend. Jay-Z came out and performed a modified "Numb/Encore" and "Jigga What/Faint" with the band. This show turned out to be the biggest capacity Projekt Revolution to date. Camera operators obtaining interviews revealed intentions for a DVD, which has been confirmed by Mike Shinoda to be a CD/DVD set on November 25, 2008. Shinoda posted on the band's online forum that anyone 18 or older can submit a title for the live CD/DVD which will later be turned into a poll for fans to vote for their favorite. Concerning the release date, Shinoda stated "we will be releasing it in a DVD/CD combo pack as soon as we can get it done".

Europe:

 June 21, 2008 – Reitstadion Riem, Munich, Germany
 Linkin Park
 HIM
 N*E*R*D
 The Used
 The Blackout
Setlist

 June 27, 2008 – Waldbühne, Berlin, Germany
 Linkin Park
 HIM
 N*E*R*D

 June 28, 2008 – LTU Arena, Düsseldorf, Germany
 Linkin Park
 HIM
 N*E*R*D
 The Used
 The Bravery
 Innerpartysystem

 June 29, 2008 – National Bowl, Milton Keynes, England
 Linkin Park
 Jay-Z
 Pendulum
 N*E*R*D
 Enter Shikari
 The Bravery
 Innerpartysystem
Setlist

US:

 Main Stage:
 Linkin Park
 Chris Cornell (of Soundgarden)
 The Bravery
 Busta Rhymes (left the tour – See Controversy during 2008 Tour)
 Ashes Divide
 Street Drum Corps (originally opened the Revolution Stage but were moved to the main stage)
 Revolution Stage:
 Atreyu
 10 Years
 Hawthorne Heights
 Armor for Sleep

Linkin Park changed the set-lists up a little bit, giving new intros and outros to a few songs and playing "We Made It" every show, until Busta Rhymes left the tour. Chris Cornell also collaborated with the band by singing on "Crawling". Also Chester Bennington performed "Hunger Strike" with Cornell. Street Drum Corps also performed a few songs with the band. On the two dates in Ohio, local band State Your Cause was asked to open the Revolution Stage.

Controversy during 2008 tour 

During the Projekt Revolution Tour of 2008, Busta Rhymes was announced to have left the tour after only eleven days due to "complicated business matters", amidst rumors he had been removed from the lineup after an alleged backstage confrontation with Linkin Park's Mike Shinoda. Shinoda later posted on his blog that he and the rest of his band were disappointed to see Rhymes leave, implying that the rumour was false. Busta actually left the tour due to an argument with his now former label Interscope Records. Since he left the label, he no longer had support to be on the tour.

2011 

This was the shortest Projekt Revolution to date, with only four shows in Europe. This tour was done by Linkin Park, Dredg and Middle Class Rut
 June 16, 2011 – Kaisaniemi Park, Helsinki, Finland with Die Antwoord
 June 18, 2011 – Festwiese, Leipzig, Germany with Guano Apes and Anberlin
 June 19, 2011 – Hessentagsarena, Oberursel, Germany with Anberlin and Die Antwoord
 June 25, 2011 – Messegelände München Riem, Munich, Germany with Guano Apes and Anberlin

References

External links 
 Projekt Revolution Media Player
 Projekt Revolution Russia
 Linkin Park Network Russia

Linkin Park concert tours
Lists of concert tours
Music festivals established in 2002
Music festivals disestablished in 2011